Johann Morant (born April 7, 1986) is a French professional ice hockey defenceman who currently an unrestricted free agent. He last played for the ZSC Lions in the National League (NL). He plays with a Swiss-player license and isn't considered an import player in the NL.

References

External links

1986 births
Living people
SC Bern players
Brûleurs de Loups players
French ice hockey defencemen
HC La Chaux-de-Fonds players
Lausanne HC players
HC Lugano players
ZSC Lions players
EV Zug players